The molecular formula C14H22O (molar mass: 206.324 g/mol) may refer to:

 Alpha-isomethyl ionone
 Cashmeran
 2,6-Di-tert-butylphenol
 Irones
 Norpatchoulenol

Molecular formulas